The 2013 6 Hours of Silverstone was an auto racing event held at the Silverstone Circuit, near Silverstone, England on 12–14 April 2013.  The event was the opening round of the 2013 FIA World Endurance Championship season, and served as the annual award for the Royal Automobile Club's Tourist Trophy.  Briton Allan McNish, Dane Tom Kristensen, and Frenchman Loïc Duval won the race for Audi, just over three seconds ahead of their teammates.  The British Delta-ADR team were victorious in the LMP2 category, while Aston Martin Racing secured both the LMGTE Pro and LMGTE Am classes.

The event weekend was shared with the European Le Mans Series, which ran the 3 Hours of Silverstone, and the FIA European Formula 3 Championship.

Qualifying
The 6 Hours of Silverstone was the first instance in which the WEC utilized a new qualifying procedure in which two drivers were required to set laps during the qualifying session.  The grid would then be determined by averaging the total of the two best laps set by each of the drivers.  Following the Silverstone qualifying session, several drivers felt the new format was too risky as all teams only had enough time to set four laps during the wet session.  The FIA later announced that qualifying would be extended by ten minutes for the next round at Spa to allow teams more leeway.

Qualifying result
Pole position winners in each class are marked in bold.

Race

Race result
Class winners in bold.  Cars failing to complete 70% of winner's distance marked as Not Classified (NC).

References

Silverstone
Silverstone
6 Hours of Silverstone
RAC Tourist Trophy
6 Hours of Silverston